Cold Mountain is a 1997 historical novel by Charles Frazier which won the U.S. 
National Book Award for Fiction. It tells the story of W. P. Inman, a wounded deserter from the Confederate army near the end of the American Civil War who walks for months to return to Ada Monroe, the love of his life; the story shares several similarities with Homer's Odyssey. The narrative alternates back and forth every chapter between the stories of Inman and Ada, a minister's daughter recently relocated from Charleston to a farm in a rural mountain community near Cold Mountain, North Carolina from which Inman hails. Though they only knew each other for a brief time before Inman departed for the war, it is largely the hope of seeing Ada again that drives Inman to desert the army and make the dangerous journey back to Cold Mountain. Details of their brief history together are told at intervals in flashback over the course of the novel.

The novel, Frazier's first, became a major best-seller, selling roughly three million copies worldwide. It was adapted into an Academy Award-winning film of the same name in 2003.

Frazier has said that the real W. P. Inman was his great-granduncle who lived near the real Cold Mountain, which is now within the Pisgah National Forest, Haywood County, North Carolina.  In the book's acknowledgments, Frazier apologizes for taking "great liberties" in writing of W. P. Inman's life. Frazier also used Hendricks County, Indiana, native John V. Hadley's book Seven Months a Prisoner as inspiration for the novel.

Plot 
The novel opens in a Confederate military hospital near Raleigh, North Carolina, where Inman is recovering from battle wounds during the American Civil War. The soldier is tired of fighting for a cause he never believed in. After considering the advice of a blind man, and moved by the death of the man in the bed next to him, he decides one night to slip out of the hospital and return home to Cold Mountain, North Carolina.

At Cold Mountain, Ada's father dies. The farm, named Black Cove, that the genteel, city-bred Ada lives on is soon reduced to a state of disrepair. But she is saved from destitution by a resourceful but homeless young woman named Ruby, who moves in with her. Together, they clean the place up and return it to productivity. Ruby also teaches Ada how to survive in those difficult times, while Ada shares her knowledge of literature with Ruby.

Inman soon becomes aware of the Confederate Home Guard, who hunt down military deserters from the Confederacy. He meets a preacher called Veasey, whom he catches in the act of attempting to murder a woman he has impregnated. After Inman dissuades him, they travel together. They butcher a dead bull that had fallen into a creek and the bull's owner, Junior, gives them away to the Home Guard. They are put into a group of other captured prisoners and march for days before the Home Guard decides to simply shoot them because they are "too much trouble." Veasey steps forward to try to stop them and is killed. Inman is grazed by a bullet that passed through Veasey and is thought to be dead. The Guardsmen dig a shoddy mass grave and Inman pulls himself out, helped in part by some passing wild pigs. He cannot bury Veasey, so he turns him face down and continues on.

Inman's journey is rough. He faces hunger and an attempted armed robbery at a rural tavern, even though he carries a LeMat revolver for protection. Occasionally, he is helped and sheltered by civilians who want nothing to do with the war. Through cunning ingenuity, he helps one of them track and recover a hog, her only possession and source of food for the winter, which had just been seized by Union soldiers. He is also helped by a woman who owns goats, who gives him advice and medicines to finally heal his wounds.

Ruby's father, Stobrod, is caught stealing corn at Ada's farm. Ruby reveals he was a deadbeat who neglected and abandoned her when she was very young; he is also a Confederate deserter. Nevertheless, Ruby grudgingly feeds him. Soon he returns another day with a simple-minded friend named Pangle. Together they entertain everyone by playing the fiddle and banjo. However, the Home Guard, led by the sadistic Captain Teague, eventually tracks them down and shoots them. A third companion, referred to as "Georgia," escapes the killing and goes off to alert Ada and Ruby. The two women ride and find Stobrod barely alive. Ada and Ruby pitch camp to give him a place to recover.

After Inman arrives at Black Cove to find it empty, he sets out to find Ada on the mountain. Unexpectedly he soon encounters her out hunting wild turkeys. Both have changed so greatly in their appearance and demeanor since they parted that it is some moments before they recognize one another. Inman takes up camp with Ada and Ruby. Ruby is afraid Ada will dismiss her now she has a husband, and Ada reassures her that she needs her as a friend and for her ideas and help. Ruby gives the pair her blessing. Later Ada and Inman make love. They happily begin to imagine the life they will have together at Black Cove and make plans for their future.

However, as the party begins the trek back to the farm, they encounter the Home Guard. A shootout commences in which Inman kills all the members of the Home Guard except for 17-year-old Birch, Teague's vicious protégé. Inman eventually corners the boy against a rock ledge but is reluctant to shoot him down in cold blood. However, after attempts fail to convince Birch to lay down his arms and leave, the boy shoots and kills Inman.

Ada is left a pregnant widow. She raises her daughter at Black Cove, where she lives with Ruby, who got married with “Georgia” and has three sons, and Stobrod.

Awards and nominations
Cold Mountain won the National Book Award,
the W.D. Weatherford Award (1997),
and the Boeke Prize (1998).

Adaptations
The book was adapted for the screen by director Anthony Minghella, as the 2003 film Cold Mountain, starring Jude Law, Nicole Kidman, and Renée Zellweger. The film was nominated for seven Academy Awards, including Best Actor for Jude Law, and won the Oscar for Best Supporting Actress for Renée Zellweger.
The novel has been adapted as an opera, Cold Mountain, which was presented during the 2015 summer festival season by The Santa Fe Opera, in co-commissions and co-productions with Opera Philadelphia and the Minnesota Opera, in collaboration with North Carolina Opera, and recorded for  PENTATONE (PTC 5186583).  The work was composed by the 2010 Pulitzer Prize winner in music, Jennifer Higdon, from a libretto written by Gene Scheer. It was Higdon's first opera.

Reception
Cold Mountain has received a mixed critical reception. "Kirkus Reviews" in The Atlantic praises Frazier's use of language, writing: "Frazier has Cormac McCarthy's gift for rendering the pitch and tang of regional speech, and for catching some of the true oddity of human nature." Kirkus goes on to say that Cold Mountain is "a promising but overlong, uneven debut." Again the critic praises and rebukes the novel, stating: "the tragic climax is convincing but somewhat rushed, given the many dilatory scenes that have preceded it." The length of the novel and the slow pace of the storytelling are again brought into question when the critic claims "there's no doubt that Frazier can write; the problem is that he stops so often to savor the sheer pleasure of the act of writing in this debut effort." The online periodical Publishers Weekly produced a more positive review of the book's writing: "Frazier vividly depicts the rough and varied terrain of Inman's travels and the colorful characters he meets." Publishers Weekly goes on to say that "Frazier shows how lives of soldiers and of civilians alike deepen and are transformed as a direct consequence of the war's tragedy." James Polk's New York Times review notes that, "For a first novelist, in fact for any novelist, Charles Frazier has taken on a daunting task -- and has done extraordinarily well by it. In prose filled with grace notes and trenchant asides, he has reset much of the Odyssey in 19th-century America, near the end of the Civil War."

References

1997 American novels
Novels set during the American Civil War
American novels adapted into films
Novels adapted into operas
American historical novels
National Book Award for Fiction winning works
Novels set in Appalachia
Novels set in North Carolina
Novels based on the Odyssey
Atlantic Monthly Press books
1997 debut novels
Modern adaptations of the Odyssey